Joan Huber (born 17 October 1925) is an American sociologist and professor emeritus of sociology at Ohio State University. Huber served as  the 79th president of the American Sociological Association in 1989. Huber taught at the University of Notre Dame from 1967 to 1971, eventually moving to Illinois, where she taught at the University of Illinois at Urbana/Champaign. While instructing numerous sociology courses at the University of Illinois at Urbana/Champaign, Huber served as the director of Women's Studies Program for two years (1978–1980), and then became the head of the Department of Sociology in 1979 until 1983. In 1984, Huber left Illinois for an opportunity at the Ohio State University, where she became the dean of the College of Social and Behavioral Sciences, coordinating dean of the Colleges of the Arts and Sciences, and senior vice president for academic affairs and university provost. During her time, Huber was president of Sociologists for Women in Society from 1972–1974, the Midwest Sociological Society from 1979–1980, and the American Sociological Association from 1988–1989. Being highly recognized for her excellence, in 1985 Huber was given the Jessie Bernard Award by the American Sociological Association. Not only was Huber an instructor of sociology at multiple institutions or president of different organization, she also served different editorial review boards, research committees, and counseled and directed many institutions on their sociology departments.

Life

Early life 
Huber was born on October 17, 1925 in Bluffton, Ohio, to her mother, Hallie Althaus, and her father, Lawrence Huber, an entomologist. As a child, Huber lived in Wooster, Ohio, where her father worked at the Agricultural Experiment Station. Her scholarly influences were her father's education (Ph.D.) and The College of Wooster, a liberal arts college, located in the town. Huber graduated from Wooster High School in 1941.

Family 
Daughter of Hallie Althaus and Lawrence Huber, Joan's father was an entomologist and studied insects in Wooster, Ohio. Lawrence Huber worked at the Agricultural Experiment Station, which is now known as the College of Food, Agricultural, and Environmental Sciences (CFAFES). Joan's father also received his doctorate degree. Huber first married around 1945 to Tony Rytina, after she graduated from Penn State. In her first marriage she had two children, Nancy and Steve. Huber met her second husband in 1971 and both accepted jobs at the University of Illinois.

Education 
In 1945, Huber graduated from the Pennsylvania State University, where she earned and completed her bachelor's degree in German in less than two years. Following her graduation at the Pennsylvania State University, Huber then attended Western Michigan University, pursuing a master's degree. Ultimately receiving a master's in sociology in 1963, Huber then went on and furthered her education at  Michigan State University and in 1967 she graduated and received her Ph.D.

Career 
Huber's work focused around gender stratification, which looks at the uneven dispersal of wealth, power, and privilege between the sexes and the absence of women in the political sphere. Huber first taught at the University of Notre Dame from 1967 to 1971, eventually moving to the University of Illinois at Urbana/Champaign. While there, Huber served as the director of the Women's Studies Program for two years (1978–1980), becoming the head of the Department of Sociology in 1979 until 1983. In 1984, Huber moved to Ohio State University, where she became the dean of the College of Social and Behavioral Sciences, coordinating dean of the colleges of the Arts and Sciences, and senior vice president for academic affairs and university provost. Huber was president of Sociologists for Women in Society from 1972 to 1974, the Midwest Sociological Society from 1979 to 1980, and the American Sociological Association from 1988 to 1989. In 1985 Huber was given the Jessie Bernard Award by the American Sociological Association. Huber retired in 1993 after 48 years of research and education.

In 2007 Huber wrote On the Origins of Gender Inequality. In her book, Huber discusses asymmetrical gender inequality and how it has perpetuated men's domination of human societies and women's subordination. Finding that important biodata from studies of sex and gender stratification has been excluded from sociology, Huber argues that it is critical to acknowledge biological sex differences to comprehend the small role that women have played in activities of more power and prestige.

Educational positions 
 Pennsylvania State University (1945–1947), German department instructor
 University of Notre Dame (1967–1971), sociology
 University of Illinois at Urbana/Champaign (1979–1983), intro sociology, sociology of poverty, social stratification, introduction to women's studies program
 Ohio State University (1984–1992), dean of the College of Social and Behavioral Sciences
 Ohio State University (1986–1992), coordinating dean of the colleges of the arts and sciences
 Ohio State University (1992–1993), senior vice president for academic affairs and university provost

Selected publications 
 Joan Huber, On the Origins of Gender Inequality. New York: Routledge, 2007.  
 Joan Huber, "Macro-Micro Links in Gender Stratification: 1989 Presidential Address".
 Joan Huber, "A Theory of Family, Economics, and Gender".

External links 
 Joan Huber Faculty Bio Page at Ohio State University
 Joan Huber papers, 1961–2011 at Penn State Library
 Joan Huber Page, American Sociological Association

References 

1925 births
Living people
21st-century American women
American sociologists
American women sociologists
Presidents of the American Sociological Association
Pennsylvania State University alumni
Western Michigan University alumni
Michigan State University alumni